The green-backed honeyeater (Glycichaera fallax) is a species of bird in the family Meliphagidae. It is monotypic within the genus Glycichaera.
It is found in the Aru Islands, New Guinea and northern Cape York Peninsula.  Its natural habitat is subtropical or tropical moist lowland forests.

References 

green-backed honeyeater
Birds of New Guinea
Birds of Cape York Peninsula
green-backed honeyeater
Taxonomy articles created by Polbot